Ngawal (Nawal) is a village development committee in Manang District in the Gandaki Zone of northern Nepal. At the time of the 2011 Nepal census it had a population of 274. Ngawal VDC is one of the Seven Village Development Committee in Upper Manang. One of the main attraction of this village is a centuries-old cave of Guru Rinpoche that is on the hills overlooking Ngawal village. The local people believes the cave leads to Mustang. And a monastery in Tibetan Nyingma pa sect which is called Portoche Monastery. 
16

References

Populated places in Manang District, Nepal